Milan Jaleel is an Indian film producer and distributor mainly works in Malayalam cinema. He produce and distribute films under the banner of Galaxy Films. He started his production works in 1997 by producing the movie Kalyanappittannu.

At present he is the president of Kerala Film Producers' Association.

Production and distribution

References

External links
 

Malayalam film producers
1960 births
Living people
Film producers from Thrissur